Allan Morris Brandt (born 1953) is a historian of medicine and the Amalie Kass Professor of History of Medicine and Professor of the History of Science at Harvard University. He is an author of several books, including The Cigarette Century: The Rise, Fall, and Deadly Persistence of the Product that Defined America, which was a finalist for the Pulitzer Prize for General Non-Fiction.

Life
Brandt received his B.A. in history from Brandeis University in 1974. He then attended Columbia University, where he received his Ph.D. (1983) in American history. He has written on the social history of epidemic disease; the history of public health and health policy; and the history of human experimentation among other topics. In 1998, he was elected to the Institute of Medicine of the National Academy of Sciences. In September 2004, he testified as an expert witness for the U.S. Department of Justice in U.S. v Philip Morris et al. The federal district court judge in the case found that the companies had violated racketeering and fraud (RICO) statutes over a fifty-year period. Brandt has been elected to the Institute of Medicine of the National Academy of Sciences and the American Academy of Arts and Sciences.

His most recent book, The Cigarette Century, was awarded the Bancroft Prize in 2008.

He was co-author of a 1985 article about AIDS in Harper's.

Brandt is a fellow of the Hastings Center, a bioethics research center.

Awards
 2011 The William H. Welch Medal of the American Association for the History of Medicine
 2008 Bancroft Prize
 2007 Albert J. Beveridge Award from the American Historical Association and the Arthur Viseltear Prize from the American Public Health Association for The Cigarette Century: The Rise, Fall, and Deadly Persistence of the Product that Defined America

Books

References

External links
"An interview with Allan M. Brandt", American Scientist, Greg Ross
"Cody's Books: The Cigarette Century", FORA.tv
"Our Plans for the Future", Harvard Crimson, Allan M. Brandt, Evelynn M. Hammonds, and Michael D. Smith, May 21, 2009
"Book Review: No Magic Bullet", Journal of Medicine and Philosophy 1985 10(4):397-398

American medical historians
1953 births
Living people
Brandeis University alumni
Columbia Graduate School of Arts and Sciences alumni
Harvard University faculty
Hastings Center Fellows
Harvard Medical School faculty
Bancroft Prize winners
Members of the National Academy of Medicine